Me and My Kid Brother and Doggie is a 1969 Danish comedy film directed by Lau Lauritzen Jr. and Lisbeth Movin and starring Dirch Passer.

Cast

Dirch Passer as Søren
Poul Reichhardt as Peter
Karl Stegger as Thorvald
Guri Richter as Olivia
Lotte Horne as Lone
Jesper Langberg as Jens
Peter Reichhardt as Lille Peter
Helge Kjærulff-Schmidt as Pastor Weinholm
Else Petersen as Pastorens kone
Preben Mahrt as Bosholm
Lotte Tarp as Fru Bosholm
Christian Arhoff as Rasmus
Gunnar Lemvigh as Direktør Holgersen
Per Goldschmidt as Slagter Otto Kristoffersen
Jørgen Weel as Kriminalassistent Lund
Henrik Wiehe as Hansen
Per Bentzon
Lone Lau as Sofie
Erik Paaske as TV journalist
Søren Steen as Jornalisten
Knud Hilding as Postbud Valdemar
Flemming Dyjak as Slagsbror
Carl Nielsen
Gunnar Hansen as Himself
Lisbeth Movin

External links

1969 films
1960s Danish-language films
1969 comedy films
Films directed by Lau Lauritzen Jr.
Films directed by Lisbeth Movin
Films scored by Sven Gyldmark
ASA Filmudlejning films
Danish comedy films